Harrogate Baptist Church is located on Victoria Avenue in Harrogate. It is a Grade II listed building.

History

Harrogate Baptist Church opened in 1883. It was designed by William Peachey.

Organ

The church started with a 2 manual pipe organ dating from 1884 by William Hill. This was rebuilt in 1898 by James Jepson Binns. The specification can be found on the National Pipe Organ Register.

References

Baptist churches in Yorkshire
Baptist
Grade II listed churches in North Yorkshire
Churches completed in 1883
William Peachey buildings